Svetlana Iosifovna Alliluyeva (born Stalina; 28 February 1926 – 22 November 2011), later known as Lana Peters, was the youngest child and only daughter of Soviet leader Joseph Stalin and his second wife Nadezhda Alliluyeva. In 1967, she became an international sensation when she defected to the United States and, in 1978, became a naturalized citizen. From 1984 to 1986, she briefly returned to the Soviet Union and had her Soviet citizenship reinstated. She was Stalin's last surviving child.

Early life

Svetlana Stalina was born on 28 February 1926. As her mother was interested in pursuing a professional career, Alexandra Bychokova was hired as a nanny to look after Alliluyeva and her older brother Vasily (born 1921). Alliluyeva and Bychokova became quite close, and remained friends for 30 years, until Bychokova died in 1956.

On 9 November 1932, Alliluyeva's mother shot herself. To conceal the suicide, the children were told that she had died of peritonitis, a complication from appendicitis. It would be 10 years before they learned the truth of their mother's death. 

In 1933, Alliluyeva and Vasily began attending Moscow School No. 25; while Vasily was transferred to a new school in 1937, Alliluyeva would stay until 1943 when she graduated the 10th grade. At the school, Alliluyeva was given no special treatment, and was regarded simply as another student.

On 15 August 1942, Winston Churchill saw Alliluyeva in Stalin's private apartments at the Kremlin, describing her as "a handsome red-haired girl, who kissed her father dutifully". Churchill says Stalin "looked at me with a twinkle in his eye as if, so I thought, to convey 'You see, even we Bolsheviks have a family life.'"

At the age of sixteen, Alliluyeva fell in love with Aleksei Kapler, a Jewish Soviet filmmaker who was 38-years-old. Her father vehemently disapproved of the relationship and Kapler was sentenced to five years of exile in 1943 to Vorkuta and was then sentenced again in 1948 to five years in labor camps near Inta.

Marriages

Alliluyeva was first married in 1944 to Grigory Morozov, a student at Moscow University's Institute of International Affairs. Her father did not like Morozov, who was Jewish, though he never met him. They had one child, a son Iosif, who was born in 1945. The couple divorced in 1947, but remained close friends for decades afterwards.

Alliluyeva's second marriage was arranged for her to Yuri Zhdanov, the son of Stalin's right-hand man Andrei Zhdanov and himself one of Stalin's close associates. The couple married early in 1949. Alliluyeva lived with Zhdanov's family at this time, though felt herself dominated by his mother, Zinaida, which was something Stalin had warned her of. Yuri was devoted to Zinaida, and busied himself with Party work, so did not spend a lot of time with Alliluyeva. In 1950, Alliluyeva gave birth to a daughter, Yekaterina. The marriage was dissolved soon afterwards.

In 1962, she married Ivan Svanidze, the nephew of Stalin's first wife, Kato Svanidze, soon after meeting him for the first time since his parents' arrest in 1937. They went against Soviet policy by marrying in a church. Svanidze was not healthy, owing to difficulties of his internal exile in Kazakhstan, and the marriage ended within a year.

From 1970 to 1973, she was married to American architect William Wesley Peters (an acolyte of Frank Lloyd Wright), with whom she had a daughter, Olga Peters (later known also as Chrese Evans).

After the death of Stalin

After her father's death in 1953, Alliluyeva worked as a lecturer and translator in Moscow. Her training was in History and Political Thought, a subject she was forced to study by her father, although her true passion was literature and writing. In a 2010 interview, she stated that his refusal to let her study arts and his treatment of Kapler were the two times that Stalin "broke my life," and that Stalin loved her but was "a very simple man. Very rude. Very cruel." When asked at a New York conference about whether she agreed with her father's rule, she said that she was disapproving of a lot of his decisions but also noted that the responsibility for them also lay with the Communist regime in general.

Relationship with Brajesh Singh

In 1963, while in hospital for a tonsillectomy, Alliluyeva met Kunwar Brajesh Singh, an Indian Communist visiting Moscow. The two fell in love. Singh was mild-mannered and well-educated but gravely ill with bronchiectasis and emphysema. The romance grew deeper and stronger still while the couple were recuperating in Sochi near the Black Sea. Singh returned to Moscow in 1965 to work as a translator, but he and Alliluyeva were not allowed to marry. He died the following year, in 1966. She was allowed to travel to India to take his ashes to his family to pour into the Ganges river. In an interview on 26 April 1967, she referred to Singh as her husband but also stated that they were never allowed to marry officially.

Political asylum and later life

Alliluyeva asked to have an official permission to stay in India through the Soviet ambassador, Ivan Benediktov. However, her request was not accepted, and instead, she was ordered to return to the Soviet Union. Then, on 9 March 1967, Alliluyeva approached the United States Embassy in New Delhi. After she stated her desire to defect in writing, the United States ambassador Chester Bowles offered her political asylum and a new life in the United States.

Alliluyeva accepted. The Indian government feared condemnation by the Soviet Union, so she was immediately sent from India to Rome. When the Qantas flight arrived in Rome, Alliluyeva immediately traveled farther to Geneva, Switzerland, where the government arranged her a tourist visa and accommodation for six weeks. She traveled to the United States, leaving her adult children in the USSR. Upon her arrival in New York City in April 1967, she gave a press conference denouncing her father's legacy and the Soviet government.

After living for several months in Mill Neck, Long Island under Secret Service protection, Alliluyeva moved to Princeton, New Jersey, where she lectured and wrote, later moving to Pennington, and then to Wisconsin.

In a 2010 interview, she described herself as "quite happy here [in Wisconsin]." Her children who were left behind in the Soviet Union did not maintain contact with her. While Western sources saw a KGB hand behind this, her children claimed that this is because of her complex character. In 1983, after the Soviet government had stopped blocking Alliluyeva's attempts to communicate with her USSR-based children, her son Iosif began to call her regularly and planned to visit her in England, but was refused permission to travel by the Soviet authorities.

She experimented with various religions. While some claim she had money problems, others argue that her financial situation was good, because of her great popularity. For example, her first book, Twenty Letters to a Friend, caused a worldwide sensation and brought her, some estimate, about $2,500,000. Alliluyeva herself stated that she gave away much of her book proceeds to charity and by around 1986 had become impoverished, facing debt and failed investments.

In 1970, Alliluyeva answered an invitation from Frank Lloyd Wright's widow, Olgivanna Lloyd Wright, to visit Wright's winter studio, Taliesin West, in Scottsdale, Arizona. In 1978, Alliluyeva became a US citizen, and in 1982, she moved with her daughter to Cambridge in England, where they shared an apartment near the Cambridge University Botanic Garden.

In 1984, during a time where Stalin's legacy saw partial rehabilitation in the Soviet Union, she moved back together with her daughter Olga, and both were given Soviet citizenship.

The British journalist Miriam Gross with whom Alliluyeva conducted her final interview before moving back from England to the Soviet Union in 1984, described Svetlana's increasingly fragile state of mind in a series of letters she wrote to Gross following the interview:

In 1986, she again moved back from the Soviet Union to the U.S. with Olga, and after her return denied anti-Western comments she had made while back in the USSR (including that she had not enjoyed "one single day" of freedom in the West and had been a pet of the CIA).

Alliluyeva, for the most part, lived the last two years of her life in southern Wisconsin, either in Richland Center or in Spring Green, the location of Wright's summer studio "Taliesin." She died on 22 November 2011 from complications arising from colon cancer in Richland Center, where she had spent time while visiting from Cambridge.

Olga, Alliluyeva's daughter with Peters, now goes by the name Chrese Evans and lives in Portland, Oregon. Her older daughter, Yekaterina, is a volcanologist in Siberia's Kamchatka Peninsula. Alliluyeva's son Iosif, a cardiologist, died in Russia in 2008. Iosif's son Ilya Voznesensky was previously in a relationship with Boris Berezovsky's daughter Elizaveta, with whom he has a son, Savva.

Religion

Alliluyeva was baptized into the Russian Orthodox Church on 20 March 1963. During her years of exile, she flirted with various religions. She then turned to the Orthodox Church and is also reported to have thought of becoming a nun.

In 1967, Alliluyeva found herself spending time with Roman Catholics in Switzerland and encountered many denominations during her time in the United States. She received a letter from Father Garbolino, an Italian Catholic priest from Pennsylvania, inviting her to make a pilgrimage to Fátima, Portugal, on the occasion of the 50th anniversary of the famous apparitions there. In 1969, Garbolino was in New Jersey and  went to visit Alliluyeva at Princeton. In California, she lived with a Catholic couple, Michael and Rose Ginciracusa, for two years (1976–78). She read books by authors such as Raissa Maritain. In Cambridge on 13 December 1982, the feast of Saint Lucy of Syracuse, Alliluyeva converted to the Catholic Church.

Works 

While in the Soviet Union, Alliluyeva had written a memoir in Russian in 1963. The manuscript was carried safely out of the country by Indian Ambassador T. N. Kaul, who returned it to her in New Delhi. Alliluyeva handed her memoir over to the CIA agent Robert Rayle at the time of her own defection. Rayle made a copy of it. The book was titled Twenty Letters to a Friend ("Dvadtsat' pisem k drugu"). It was the only thing other than a few items of clothing taken by Alliluyeva on a secret passenger flight out of India. Raymond Pearson, in Russia and Eastern Europe, described Alliluyeva's book as a naïve attempt to shift the blame for Stalinist crimes onto Lavrentiy Beria, and whitewash her own father.

In popular culture

Alliluyeva was portrayed by Joanna Roth in the HBO's 1992 television film Stalin and Andrea Riseborough in the 2017 satirical film The Death of Stalin.

Alliluyeva is the subject of the 2015 biography Stalin's Daughter: The Extraordinary and Tumultuous Life of Svetlana Alliluyeva by Canadian writer Rosemary Sullivan.

Alliluyeva is the subject of the 2019 novel The Red Daughter by American writer John Burnham Schwartz.

Miscellaneous

Alliluyeva's KGB nickname was Kukushka ("cuckoo bird"). However, when she defected to the United States, the CIA reportedly gave her an IQ test and her score was "off the charts."

See also

 List of Eastern Bloc defectors
 List of people granted political asylum

Notes

References

Bibliography

External links

 (Donated by Thomas Whitney in 1991).
The Papers of Svetlana Alliluyeva held at Churchill Archives Centre

1926 births
2011 deaths
American people of Georgian (country) descent
American people of Russian descent
American people of Romani descent
American people of Ukrainian descent
American people of German-Russian descent
Russian Roman Catholics
Converts to Roman Catholicism from Eastern Orthodoxy
Deaths from cancer in Wisconsin
Deaths from colorectal cancer
Former American Orthodox Christians
Georgian (country) memoirists
Moscow State University alumni
Naturalised citizens of the United Kingdom
Naturalized citizens of the United States
People from Cambridge
People from Pennington, New Jersey
People from Princeton, New Jersey
People from Richland Center, Wisconsin
American emigrants to England
Soviet emigrants to the United States
Soviet dissidents
Soviet memoirists
Children of Joseph Stalin
Daughters of national leaders
Writers from Moscow
Soviet emigrants to the United Kingdom
Soviet women writers